A tendon is a high-tensile-strength band of connective tissue that connects muscle to bone.

Tendon may also refer to:

 Tendon as food, use of tendons in cuisine in various cultures
 Tendon (Japanese cuisine), a type of Japanese rice bowl dish or donburi
 Tendon, Vosges, a commune in the Vosges département in France
 Tendon (album), by Reniss, 2016
 Tendon, a reinforcing element in prestressed concrete

See also
 
 
 Tenon, type of joint that connects two pieces of wood or other material
 Tend (disambiguation)